The 1978 Florida gubernatorial election was held on November 4, 1978. Democratic nominee Bob Graham was elected, defeating Republican nominee Jack Eckerd with 55.59% of the vote.

Primary elections
Primary elections were held on September 12, 1978. The Democratic runoff was held on October 5, 1978.

Democratic primary

Candidates

Leroy Eden, bar owner
 Maria Kay
Bob Graham, State Senator
Wayne Mixson, State Representative
Claude R. Kirk Jr., former Republican Governor
Mary L. Singleton, the former director of the state Division of Elections, Jacksonville City Council
Robert L. Shevin, Florida Attorney General
Jim Glisson, State Senator
Bruce A. Smathers, former Secretary of State of Florida
Charles W. Boyd, State Representative 
Hans Tanzler, Mayor of Jacksonville
Manuel "Manolo" Arques, real estate and insurance executive from Miami.
James H. Williams, Lieutenant Governor of Florida
Betty Castor, State Senate

Seven tickets ran for the Democratic nomination for governor of Florida.

Jim Williams, the lieutenant governor, ran for governor with former state Senator Betty Castor of Florida, as his running mate. Hans G. Tanzler, the mayor of Jacksonville, ran with Manuel "Manolo" Arques, a Cuban-American real estate and insurance executive from Miami. State Secretary of State Bruce Smathers (who resigned to run) ran with state Representative Charles W. Boyd.

Claude R. Kirk Jr. of Palm Beach, who was the Republican governor of Florida from 1967 to 1971, returned to the party he left 28 years prior, switching his party affiliation to Democratic on July 5, 1978 (the month prior re-registering as an independent and launching an abortive signature drive to get on the ballot as an independent. He chose as his running mate Mary L. Singleton, the former director of the state Division of Elections and the first black woman to sit on the Jacksonville City Council.

Results

Republican primary

Candidates
Jack Eckerd, businessman and administrator of the General Services Administration
Louis Frey Jr., U.S. Representative for the 9th district

Results

General election

Candidates
Bob Graham, Democratic
Jack Eckerd, Republican

Results

References

Bibliography
 

1978
Florida
Gubernatorial
November 1978 events in the United States